This is a list of the main career statistics of professional Russian tennis player Daria Kasatkina.

Performance timelines

Only main-draw results in WTA Tour, Grand Slam tournaments, Fed Cup/Billie Jean King Cup and Olympic Games are included in Win–loss records.

Singles
Current after the 2023 Dubai Open.

Doubles
Current after the 2022 Australian Open.

Significant finals

WTA 1000 finals

Singles: 1 (1 runner-up)

WTA career finals

Singles: 12 (6 titles, 6 runner–ups)

Doubles: 3 (1 title, 2 runner-ups)

ITF Circuit finals

Singles: 7 (7 titles)

Doubles: 2 (2 runner-ups)

Junior Grand Slam finals

Girls' singles: 1 (1 title)

Fed Cup/Billie Jean King Cup participation
This table is current through the 2019 Fed Cup

Singles (3–1)

Doubles (2–2)

WTA Tour career earnings
Current after the 2022 US Open.

Career Grand Slam statistics

Seedings
The tournaments won by Kasatkina are in boldface, and advanced into finals by Kasatkina are in italics.

Best Grand Slam results details 
Grand Slam winners are in boldface, and runner–ups are in italics.

Singles

Record against other players

No. 1 wins

Record against top 10 players

 She has a  record against players who were, at the time the match was played, ranked in the top 10.

Notes

References

External links
 
 
 

Kasatkina, Daria